Nanyang is a Township-level division within Shouning County, in the municipal region of Ningde City, in Fujian Province of eastern China.

Geography
Nanyang borders the county-level city of Fu'an to the southeast.

On all other sides it is bordered by towns and townships forming part of Shouning County: 
Xixi to the east; 
Da'an to the north; 
Qinyang to the northwest; 
Qingyuan to the west; 
Xietan to the southwest; 
Zhuguanlong to the south.

Ningde
Township-level divisions of Fujian